Hanyang Cyber University is a virtual university in South Korea, founded in 2002.

External links
 Korean website
English website

Universities and colleges in Seoul
Distance education institutions based in South Korea